"Pass Me Not, O Gentle Savior" is a 19th-century American hymn written by Fanny Crosby in 1868, set to music by William H. Doane in 1870.

M.C. Hammer recording
In 1991 hip hop artist MC Hammer released a version of the hymn entitled "Do Not Pass Me By" on his fourth album, Too Legit to Quit - basically rap parts added to an up-tempo arrangement by Douglas Miller entitled "Pass Me By" from 1986.  Gospel artist Tramaine Hawkins appeared on the song as a guest vocalist. A music video was produced for this single which charted as well.

Chart performance

Other recordings
The hymn has been recorded by singers including Reggie Houston, Cyrus Chestnut, Bill Gaither, and Lyle Lovett. Bob Dylan performed this song live to open five concerts in his 2002 American tour.

References

External links
 Lyrics and commentary on Dylan's performances at Not Dark Yet

Hymns by Fanny Crosby
Songs with lyrics by Fanny Crosby
1868 songs
1868 in Christianity
MC Hammer songs
Songs about Jesus